The Bavarian Group Administration or Gruppenverwaltung Bayern was a largely autonomous railway administration within the Deutsche Reichsbahn (German Imperial Railways) between the two world wars. It was formed on 1 April 1920 from the former Bavarian State Railways, and was unique, Bavaria being the only former German state to have such status after the merger of the seven state railway companies into the Reichsbahn. The rest of Germany was simply divided into various regional Reichsbahn railway divisions.

The Bavarian Group Administration itself also had four railway divisions: Augsburg, Munich, Nuremberg and Regensburg which reported to it and not, as in the rest of Germany, to the Reichsbahn directly. The former Palatinate Railway formed the Ludwigshafen division. On 1 October 1933, as the only group administration within the Deutsche Reichsbahn, the Gruppenverwaltung Bayern, was disbanded.

Between 1920 and about 1924 when the Deutsche Reichsbahn-Gesellschaft was created as a company to run the railways, wagons of the Bavarian Group Administration continued to display the blue and white Bavarian state shield.

Sources
 Geschäftsordnung der Deutschen Reichsbahn-Gesellschaft, ss. 14, 15, 20, 21 und 24 (Regulations of the Deutsche Reichsbahn-Gesellschaft, Section III, paragraphs 14, 15, 20, 21 and 24). See .

See also
History of rail transport in Germany
Royal Bavarian State Railways
List of Bavarian locomotives and railbuses

Defunct railway companies of Germany
History of rail transport in Bavaria
20th century in Bavaria
Railway companies established in 1920
German companies established in 1920